Allen Webster “Web” Hawkins (December 15, 1925- April 8, 2016)  was newspaper editor-publisher and local community advocate. He began his career at 16 years old working as a printer’s devil at St. Francois County Journal earning $1.50 a week. Along with his wife Gladys Ann (Shmitty) Schmidt, Web purchased and published The Osawatomie Graphic (News). The couple acquired other journals including The Linn County News; Louisburg Herald; and The Emporia Times. The couple also had partial ownership in: The Hillsboro Star-Journal and The Herington Times. Hawkins presided over the National Newspaper Association and Kansas Press Association. He is enshrined in the Kansas Press Association's Newspaper Hall of Fame.

Recognition 
Hawkins received awards:

 The (1987) University of Missouri School of Journalism Honor Medal;
 The (1988) NNA’s Robert M. Bailey Award;
 The (1996) KPA’s Clyde M. Reed Jr. Master Editor Award.

References

1925 births
2016 deaths
American newspaper editors
American printers